The women's doubles tennis event at the 2018 Asian Games took place at the Tennis Court of Jakabaring Sport City, Palembang, Indonesia from 20 to 25 August 2018.

Luksika Kumkhum and Tamarine Tanasugarn were the defending champions, however Tanasugarn has retired from professional tennis in 2016, while Kumkhum chose not to compete in this event. Xu Yifan and Yang Zhaoxuan won the gold medal, defeating Chan Hao-ching and Latisha Chan in the final. Gozal Ainitdinova and Anna Danilina, and Miyu Kato and Makoto Ninomiya won the bronze medals.

Schedule
All times are Western Indonesia Time (UTC+07:00)

Results
Legend
r — Retired

Final

Top half

Bottom half

References
 Draw

External links
Official website

Tennis at the 2018 Asian Games